Narong Suwannachot, is a Thai football manager.

References

Living people
1960 births
Narong Suwannachot
Narong Suwannachot